Jean-Jacques Bougouhi (born 12 June 1992) is an Ivorian former professional football player who played as a forward.

Career
Bougouhi was born in Bingerville. He made his professional debut in the Russian Football National League for FC Torpedo Armavir on 10 August 2015 in a game against FC Volga Nizhny Novgorod.

In June 2016, Bougouhi signed a long-term contract with Russian Premier League side Ural Yekaterinburg. He made his debut for Ural on 21 September 2016 in a Russian Cup game against FC Chelyabinsk. He made his Russian Premier League debut for Ural on 20 November 2016 in a game against FC Krasnodar.

On 10 July 2017, Bougouhi signed for HJK on a contract until the end of the 2017 season, with an option for an additional season.

In September 2018, Bougouhi returned to Shirak SC.

On 11 January 2019, Bougouhi left Shirak, joining Ararat-Armenia on 17 January 2019.

Career statistics

Honours
ASEC Mimosas
 Ligue 1: 2009, 2010

Shirak
 Armenian Premier League top scorer: 2014–15 (21 goals)

References

External links
 Player page on the FNL website
 

Living people
1992 births
People from Bingerville
Ivorian footballers
Association football forwards
ASEC Mimosas players
Société Omnisports de l'Armée players
FC Shirak players
FC Armavir players
FC Ural Yekaterinburg players
Helsingin Jalkapalloklubi players
İstanbulspor footballers
FC Ararat-Armenia players
Al-Mina'a SC players
Armenian Premier League players
Russian Premier League players
Russian First League players
Veikkausliiga players
TFF First League players
Ivorian expatriate footballers
Ivorian expatriate sportspeople in Armenia
Expatriate footballers in Armenia
Ivorian expatriate sportspeople in Russia
Expatriate footballers in Russia
Ivorian expatriate sportspeople in Finland
Expatriate footballers in Finland
Ivorian expatriate sportspeople in Turkey
Expatriate footballers in Turkey
Ivorian expatriate sportspeople in Iraq
Expatriate footballers in Iraq